The Main Viaduct is a double track railway bridge across the River Main at Nantenbach, Germany.  It is a continuous truss girder bridge with a main span that is 208m long, with a 12.5% slope and a radius of 2650m.  The full length of the structure is 374.4m and the side spans are each 83.2m long.

References

See also 
 List of bridges in Germany

Railway bridges in Germany